Ian Higginson (born 10 May 1947) is a former New Zealand cricket umpire. He stood in one Test match, New Zealand vs. Sri Lanka, in 1983 and two ODI games between 1983 and 1984.

See also
 List of Test cricket umpires
 List of One Day International cricket umpires

References

1947 births
Living people
New Zealand Test cricket umpires
New Zealand One Day International cricket umpires